Niaz Ahmed (3 December 1946 – 29 March 2019) was a Pakistani television, radio, and film musician. He is known for composing classical, semi-classical, and patriotic songs for Radio Pakistan and Pakistan Television. His popular melodies include "Itne Baray Jeevan Saagar Mein Tu Ne Pakistan Dia" (singer: Allan Faqir), "Dekh Tera Kiya Rang Kar dia Hai" (singer: Alamgir), "Mera Inaam Pakistan" (singer: Nusrat Fateh Ali Khan), and many others. He was honored with the Pride of Performance Award in 2004.

Early life and career
Niaz was born on December 3, 1946, in Muzaffarnagar district, Uttar Pradesh, British India. His family migrated to Karachi, Pakistan after the Partition of India. Orphaned at an early age, he was raised by his uncle Riaz Ahmed. After completing his secondary school education, Niaz showed his interest in music. His maternal side belonged to the famous musical Kirana family. He got early music lessons from Maulana Abdul Shakoor. Mastering the instruments like harmonium and accordion, he started his music career at Pakistan Television, Karachi. He, for some time, assisted the musicians like Nisar Bazmi, Aashiq Ali Khan, and Deebo Bhattacharya. For five years, he served in Radio Pakistan as an instrumentalist. 

Niaz's debut composition as a musician was "Ye Kaisa Bandhan Hai Saajan", vocalized by Mehnaz Begum and aired on Radio Pakistan. Then, he used other voices for his melodies like, Taj Multani, Ishrat Jahan, and Nighat Seema. 

The real breakthrough came when Niaz joined Pakistan Television as a music director in the 1970s. At PTV, he created a lots of memorable classical, ghazals, and pop songs, working singers such as Mehdi Hassan, Noor Jehan, Naheed Akhtar, Mehnaz, Nayyara Noor, Abida Parveen, Alamgir, Muhammad Ali Shehki, Allan Faqir, and Nusrat Fateh Ali Khan. Some of his notable melodies for PTV include, "Itne Baray Jeevan Saagar Mein Tu Ne Pakistan Dia" (sung by Allan Faqir), "Hum Mayein Hum Behnein Hum Beetiyan" (sung by Nahid Akhtar), "Har Ghari Tayar Kamran Hein Hum" (sung by Khalid Waheed), "Khusboo Ban Ke Mehak Raha Hai Mera Pakistan" (sung by Lubna Nadeem), "Tum Se Bhichar Ke Zinda Hein" (sung by Muhammad Ali Shehki), "Dekh Tera Kiya Rang Kar dia Hai" (sung by Alamgir), and "Mera Inaam Pakistan" (sung by Nusrat Fateh Ali Khan). He also gave background music for PTV Khabarnaama, Neelam Ghar, the drama serial Ajab Kahani.

Niaz also composed music for five Urdu, three Punjabi, and three Pashto films. Though, he couldn't establish himself in cinema's playback music.

Personal life
Niaz had two marriages, four daughters, and four sons. His son Waseem Niaz is also in the music industry.

Popular compositions

TV
 Itne Baray Jeevan Saagar Mein ... Singer: Allan Faqir, Poet: Jamiluddin Aali
 Hum Mayein Hum Behnein Hum Beetiyan ... Singer: Nahid Akhtar, Poet: Jamiluddin Aali
 Har Ghari Tayar Kamran Hein Hum ... Singer: Khalid Waheed, Poet: Zafar Ullah Poshni
 Khusboo Ban Ke Mehak Raha Hai Mera Pakistan... Singer: Lubna Nadeem, Poet: Ahmed Nadeem Qasmi
 Tum Se Bhichar Ke Zinda Hein ... Singer: Muhammad Ali Shehki, Poet: Iftikhar Arif
 Dekh Tera Kiya Rang Kar dia Hai ... Singer: Alamgir, Poet:
 Ye Shaam Aur Tera Naam ... Singer: Alamgir, Poet: Muhammad Nasir
 Meri Ankhon Se Es Duniya Ko Dekho Singer: Muhammad Ali Shehki, Poet: 
 Nainan Tum Chup Rehna ... Singer: Noor Jehan, Poet:
 Nazaray Humein Dekhein Hum Nazaron Ko ... Singer: Muhammad Ali Shehki, Poet: Muhammad Nasir
 Kabhi Tum Idhar Se Guzar Ke To Dekho ... Singer: Alamgir, Poet: Hassan Akbar Kamal
 Mere Pyaar Ke Tu Sung Sung Hai ... Singer: Muhammad Ali Shehki, Poet:
 Babula Way Lay Jaayen Na Log Mujh Ko ... Singer: Afshan Ahmed, Poet:

Radio
 Kajra Ri Akhion Main Nindiya Na Aaye ... Singer: Mehnaz Begum, poet:
 Kya Toota Hai Ander ... Singer: Mehdi Hassan, Poet: Farhat Shehzad

Film
 Mukh Mor Chala Dil Tor Chala Bedardi Mora Baalma ... Singer: Runa Laila, Film: Shama Parvana (1970), Poet: M. Sultan

Awards
Niaz Ahmed received 27 awards during his career, including:
 The Pride of Performance Award in 2004
 3 PTV Awards in the 'Best Musician' category

Death
After a prolonged illness, Niaz died on May 29, 2019, at the age of 72, in Lahore.

References

1946 births
2019 deaths
Muhajir people
Pakistani composers
Pakistani film score composers
People from Muzaffarnagar district
Kirana gharana
Recipients of the Pride of Performance